Ali Osman is a character from EastEnders

Ali Osman may also refer to:

Ali Osman (composer) (1958–2017), Sudanese composer
Ali Hassan Osman, Somali politician
Ali Osman (criminal), Australian criminal involved in the 2005 Cronulla riots